Laishui County is a county in central Hebei province, China, bordering the Municipality of Beijing to the north and in the basin of the Juma River. It is served by China National Highway 112 and G5 Beijing–Kunming Expressway.

Administrative divisions
There are 7 towns, 7 townships, and 1 ethnic township under the county's administration.

Towns:
Laishui, Yi'an, Shiting, Zhaogezhuang, Yongyang, Sanpo, Jiulong

Townships:
Longmen Township, Qizhongkou Township, Songgezhuang Township, Hujiazhuang Township, Mingyi Township, Wangcun Township, Dongwenshan Township, Loucun Manchu Ethnic Township

References

External links

Geography of Baoding
County-level divisions of Hebei